San Elijo Hills is a master-planned community in the southwest of San Marcos, California, built by San Elijo Hills Development Company, and managed by HomeFed Corporation. San Elijo is home to three of the largest schools in San Marcos Unified School District. Unlike the rest of San Marcos, San Elijo Hills has its own town center, featuring a public park (including a stage and seating for community events), a clock tower, a fountain, and rows of shops.

Etymology
In 1769, the Portola Expedition named the area San Alejo in honor of Saint Alexius. The term "Elijo" is an Anglo-Saxon misspelling of a proper name "Alejo."

Timeline
 1994 -  San Elijo Hills property purchased by The San Elijo Hills Development Company, planning commenced.
 1997 - Overall plan approved by the San Marcos City Council.
 2004 - San Elijo Middle School opened, with the elementary and middle schools sharing facilities for two years, until the completion of the elementary school.
 2004 - San Elijo Park, a  city park, opened.
 2004 - Peace Monument installed at the eastern entrance to the community’s town square on September 11.
 2006 - San Elijo Elementary School completed.
 2008 - Fire station opened in San Elijo Hills.
 2009 - MarketWalk, a residential/retail project in the town center, opened.
 2009 - Double Peak Park opened.
2016  - Double Peak K-8 school opened.

Education

San Marcos Unified School District

 San Elijo Middle School
 San Elijo Elementary School
 San Marcos High School
 Double Peak K-8 School

California State University, San Marcos

San Elijo Hills is served by California State University, San Marcos, located in San Marcos.

Culture

Events
The San Elijo Hills Homeowners Association organizes a number of community events, including a golf outing, Concert in the Square, Oktoberfest, Tree Lighting Ceremony, Independence Day Celebration, and Easter Egg Hunt.

Recreation

Parks

Double Peak Park
Double Peak Park features a 150-seat concrete, terraced amphitheater for interpretive ranger talks, a group picnic shelter, individual picnic tables, an adventure play area, restrooms, a resident park ranger, and a parking lot.

San Elijo Hills Park
San Elijo Hills Park includes a soccer field, two baseball diamonds, picnic/barbecue areas, a children's water "sprayground", an enclosed dog park, jogging paths, and a plaza for large events.
The park's Community Center, operated by the city of San Marcos, has facilities for classes, parties and special events. In the mid 2010's, this park was the location of unsanctioned jamborees that were carried out by the local youth population, some of whom were eventually arrested due to the illegalities involved in their partying. Such arrests led to the end of the Park's perilous nightlife, thus marking the end of what was known as "Park Night" by the local transients.

Trails
San Elijo Hills has  of trails that are popular for hiking, biking and horseback riding.

AYSO Region 1505

AYSO Region 1505 is a volunteer-run youth soccer program in San Elijo Hills and the surrounding communities.  The organization fielded 75 teams with more than 600 players in 2010.

San Elijo Flyers

The San Elijo Flyers is a powered radio-controlled flying group for RC Plane and Helicopter enthusiasts.

Photos

References

External links 

 San Elijo Hills (Official)

Neighborhoods in San Diego County, California
San Marcos, California